Philip John Guard (born 29 November 1928 in Rochford, Essex) is an English stage actor.

Guard has appeared occasionally in film and TV, but has been more prolific on stage.

He was married to the actress Charlotte Mitchell who died in 2012; they separated in 1968. His sons are the actors Christopher Guard and Dominic Guard, and his daughter is Candy Guard the writer and animator.

Guard appeared, unwittingly, along with Mark Dignam and John Bryning, on the fade-out of The Beatles' song "I Am the Walrus", on which can be heard a 1967 BBC radio broadcast of King Lear, with Guard playing "Edgar".

References

External links

English male stage actors
People from Rochford
1928 births
Living people